Juan Francisco Centelles Aizpurúa (born January 26, 1961 in Playa, Ciudad de la Habana) is a retired male high jumper from Cuba.

Achievements

References
 1983 Year Ranking

1961 births
Living people
Cuban male high jumpers
Athletes (track and field) at the 1980 Summer Olympics
Olympic athletes of Cuba
Athletes (track and field) at the 1979 Pan American Games
Athletes (track and field) at the 1983 Pan American Games
Place of birth missing (living people)
Pan American Games medalists in athletics (track and field)
Pan American Games gold medalists for Cuba
Universiade medalists in athletics (track and field)
Central American and Caribbean Games gold medalists for Cuba
Competitors at the 1982 Central American and Caribbean Games
Competitors at the 1986 Central American and Caribbean Games
Universiade silver medalists for Cuba
Central American and Caribbean Games medalists in athletics
Medalists at the 1983 Pan American Games
20th-century Cuban people